East Island is one of three islets of Ashmore Reef, which is a part of Ashmore and Cartier Islands. It is often referred to as East Islet, a name that is used, for example,  in The World Factbook; the islet's gazetted name is, however, East Island.

Like the other islands on the reef, it is unpopulated. Politically it is part of Ashmore and Cartier Islands, an external territory of Australia. Some Indonesian groups dispute Australia's claim to these island, however.

References

Ashmore and Cartier Islands